The 2000 Tro-Bro Léon was the 17th edition of the Tro-Bro Léon cycle race and was held on 28 May 2000. The race was won by Jo Planckaert.

General classification

References

2000
2000 in road cycling
2000 in French sport
May 2000 sports events in France